Paul Bley & Scorpio is an album by Paul Bley performing compositions by Annette Peacock and Carla Bley which was released by the Milestone label in 1973.

Reception

AllMusic reviewer Eugene Chadbourne noted that "This one is the album where he goes head over heels for the electric piano, and fans of jazz with that Fender Rhodes sound are going to want it ... Paul Bley sits at a bank of keyboards here, giving forth a passage on acoustic, then some chirping synthesizer, then some electric piano, and so forth ... Nothing seems to be happening on quite a bit of this record, since Bley is deep into his playing slow quest. A pity the electric piano conveys so much less of his personal musical feel, not that the instrument is incapable of it, just that Bley doesn't deliver. He also seems distracted by the banks of available keyboards".

Track listing
All compositions by Annette Peacock except where noted
 "El Cordobes" – 4:33
 "Capricorn" (Paul Bley) – 5:31
 "King Korn" (Carla Bley) – 4:55
 "Dreams" – 6:17
 "Syndrome" (Carla Bley) – 7:55
 "Gesture Without Plot" – 9:45
 "Ictus" (Carla Bley) – 4:05

Personnel 
Paul Bley – Baldwin piano, ARP synthesizer, RMI electric piano, Fender Rhodes electric piano
David Holland – acoustic bass, fuzz pedal
Barry Altschul – percussion

References 

1973 albums
Paul Bley albums
Milestone Records albums
Albums produced by Orrin Keepnews